Brian Foley (born 1934) is a retired Australian racing driver. He was active from the late 1950s through to 1974. Foley competed in Touring Car, GT and Sports Sedan categories and also contested numerous production car endurance races. His career highlights included a victory in the 1965 Lowood 4 Hour, second place in the 1967 Australian Touring Car Championship and a third-place finish in the 1965 Armstrong 500, all three attained driving a Morris Cooper S.

Early career
Foley started racing in the late 1950s, subsequently driving a variety of cars from the British Motor Corporation including Austin A30, Austin A40 Farina, Austin Lancer, Austin-Healey Sprite and Morris Cooper S. He placed ninth in Class C in the 1960 Armstrong 500 at Phillip Island driving an Austin Lancer for the B.M.C. works team. The following year Foley placed third in the 1961 Australian GT Championship driving an Austin-Healey Sprite.

Australian Touring Car Championship
Foley contested the Australian Touring Car Championship in 1960, 1964, 1965, 1967, 1968, 1969, 1970 and 1971. His best finish was a second place in  1967 driving a Morris Cooper S.

Bathurst 1000
Foley contested the Bathurst 1000 (and forerunners) each year from 1960 to 1971 and again in 1974. Highlights included a win in Class A in the 1961 Armstrong 500 driving a Studebaker Lark and third outright (and a Class C win) in the 1965 Armstrong 500 in a Morris Cooper S.

Results

References 

Australian racing drivers
1932 births
Living people